Human branding or stigmatizing is the process by which a mark, usually a symbol or ornamental pattern, is burned into the skin of a living person, with the intention that the resulting scar makes it permanent. This is performed using a hot or very cold branding iron. It therefore uses the physical techniques of livestock branding on a human, either with consent as a form of body modification; or under coercion, as a punishment or to identify an enslaved, oppressed, or otherwise controlled person. It may also be practiced as a "rite of passage", e.g. within a tribe, or to signify membership of or acceptance into an organization.

Etymology
The English verb to burn, attested since the 12th century, is a combination of Old Norse brenna "to burn, light", and two originally distinct Old English verbs: bærnan "to kindle" (transitive) and beornan "to be on fire" (intransitive), both from the Proto-Germanic root bren(wanan), perhaps from a Proto-Indo-European root bhre-n-u, from base root bhereu- "to boil forth, well up." In Dutch, (ver)branden mean "to burn", brandmerk a branded mark; similarly, in German, Brandzeichen means "a brand" and brandmarken, "to brand".

Sometimes, the word cauterize is used. This is known in English since 1541, and is derived via Medieval French cauteriser from Late Latin cauterizare "to burn or brand with a hot iron", itself from Greek καυτηριάζειν, kauteriazein, from καυτήρ kauter "burning or branding iron", from καίειν kaiein "to burn". However cauterization is now generally understood to mean a medical process – specifically to stop bleeding.

Historical use

Marking the rightless

The origin may be the ancient treatment of a slave (often without legal rights) as livestock.
European, American, and other colonial slavers branded millions of slaves during the period of the Atlantic slave trade. Sometimes there were several brandings, e.g. for the Portuguese crown and the (consecutive) private owner(s), an extra cross after baptism as well as by African slave catchers.
 Ancient Romans marked runaway slaves with the letters FVG or FUG (for fugitivus).
 In modern Sudan, there are reports of branding of slaves.
 An intermediate case between formal slavery and criminal law is when a convict is branded and legally reduced, with or without time limit, to a slave-like status, such as on the galleys (in France branded GAL or TF travaux forcés 'forced labour' until 1832), in a penal colony, or auctioned to a private owner.

As punishment

In criminal law, branding with a hot iron was a mode of punishment consisting of marking the subject as if goods or animals, sometimes concurrently with their reduction of status in life.

Brand marks have also been used as a punishment for convicted criminals, combining physical punishment, as burns are very painful, with public humiliation (greatest if marked on a normally visible part of the body) which is here the more important intention, and with the imposition of an indelible criminal record.

Robbers, like runaway slaves, were marked by the Romans with the letter F (fur); and the toilers in the mines, and convicts condemned to figure in gladiatorial shows, were branded on the forehead for identification. Under Constantine I the face was not permitted to be so disfigured, the branding being on the hand, arm or calf.

The Acts of Sharbel record it applied, amongst other tortures, to a Christian between the eyes and on the cheeks in Parthian Edessa at the time of the Roman Emperor Trajan on a judge's order for refusal to sacrifice.

In the 16th century, German Anabaptists were branded with a cross on their foreheads for refusing to recant their faith and join the Roman Catholic church.

In the North American colonial settlements of the 17th and early 18th centuries, branding was a common punishment for those found guilty of crimes. The type of brand differed from crime to crime. Men and women sentenced for adultery were branded with an A letter on their chest, D for drunkenness and B for blasphemy or burglary, T on the hand for thief, SL on the cheek for seditious libel, R on the shoulder for rogue or vagabond, and F on the cheek for forgery. Those convicted of burglary on the Lord's Day were branded upon their forehead.

During the early stages of the American Revolution, some Loyalists were branded on the face with the letters G.R (for George Rex, i.e. King George) by Patriots as punishment for perceived servility to the Crown.

The mark in later times was also often chosen as a code for the crime (e.g. D for desertion and BC for bad character in Canada. Most branded men were shipped off to a penal colony). Branding was also used by the Confederate Army during the American Civil War.

Until 1832 in France, various offenses carried the additional infamy of being branded with a fleur de lis and galley slaves could be branded GAL or, once the galleys were replaced by the bagnes on land, TF (travaux forcés, 'forced' labor, i.e. hard labour) or TFP (travaux forcés à perpetuité, hard labour for life). In most of the German-speaking states, however, branding people was unlawful.

Following the Conspiracy of the Slaves of 1749 in Malta, some slaves were branded with the letter R (for ribelli) on their forehead and condemned to the galleys for life.

Branding tended to be abolished like other judicial mutilations (with notable exceptions, such as amputation under sharia law), sooner and more widely than flogging, caning, and similar corporal punishments, which normally aim 'only' at pain and at worst cause stripe scars, although the most severe lashings (not uncommon in penal colonies) in terms of dosage and instrument (such as the proverbial knout) can even turn out to cause death.

Branding in America

As criminal punishment 
In Pennsylvania, the horse theft law "An Act to Increase the Punishments of Horse Stealing" was passed in 1780 and repealed in 1860, which stated people guilty of such a crime should be branded. The law ran as follows; "the first offense [the convicted] shall stand in the pillory for one hour, and shall be publicly whipped on his, her or their [bare] backs with thirty-nine lashes, well laid on, and at the same time shall have his, her or their ears cut off and nailed to the pillory, and for the second offense shall be whipped and pilloried in like manner and be branded on the forehead in a plain and visible manner with the letters H. T."

This punishment was referenced in Cormac McCarthy's Novel Blood Meridian as the Character Toadvine is branded with the letters H. T. on his forehead. H stands for Horse, T for Thief and F for Felon; "On his forehead were burned the letters H T and lower and almost between the eyes the letter F and these markings were splayed and garish as if the iron had been left too long. When he turned to look at the kid, the kid could see that he had no ears."

For slavery

In Louisiana, there was a "black code", or Code Noir, which allowed the cropping of ears, shoulder branding, and hamstringing, the cutting of tendons near the knee, as punishments for recaptured slaves. Slave owners used extreme punishments to stop flight, or escape. They would often brand the slaves' palms, shoulders, buttocks, or cheeks with a branding iron.

Branding was sometimes used to mark recaptured runaway slaves to help the locals easily identify the runaway. Micajah Ricks, a slave owner in Raleigh, North Carolina, was looking for his slave and described, "I burnt her with a hot iron, on the left side of her face, I tried to make the letter M."

Most slave owners would use whipping as their main method, but at other times they would use branding to punish their slaves. Another testimony explains how a slave owner in Kentucky around 1848 was looking for his runaway slave. He described her having "a brand mark on the breast something like L blotched." In South Carolina, there were many laws which permitted the punishments slaves would receive. When a slave ran away, if it was the first offense, the slave would receive no more than forty lashes. Then the second offense would be branding. The slave would have been marked with the letter R on their forehead signifying that they were a criminal, and a runaway.

As religious initiation
Ceremonial Branding is an integral part of religious initiation in most Vaishnava sects. References to this practice can be traced in texts such as Narad Panchratra, Vaikhnasagama, Skanda Purana, etc. This practice is still in vogue among Madhava sect Brahmins of Karnataka in India, who brand small marks on both shoulders (for men) or forearms (for women).

Branding in Britain
The punishment was adopted by the Anglo-Saxons, and the ancient law of England authorized the penalty. By the 
Statute of Vagabonds (1547) under King Edward VI, vagabonds and Gypsies were ordered to be branded with a large V on the breast, and "brawlers" with F for "fraymaker"; slaves who ran away were branded with S on the cheek or forehead. This law was repealed in England in 1550. From the time of Henry VII, branding was inflicted for all offences which received benefit of clergy (branding of the thumbs was used around 1600 at Old Bailey to ensure that the accused who had successfully used the Benefit of Clergy defence, by reading a passage from the Bible, could not use it more than once), but it was abolished for such in 1822. In 1698 it was enacted that those convicted of petty theft or larceny, who were entitled to benefit of clergy, should be "burnt in the most visible part of the left cheek, nearest the nose." This special ordinance was repealed in 1707. James Nayler, a Quaker who in the year 1655 was accused of claiming to be the Messiah, was convicted of blasphemy in a highly publicized trial before the Second Protectorate Parliament and had his tongue bored through and his forehead branded B for "blasphemer".

In the Lancaster Criminal Court, a branding iron is still preserved in the dock. It is a long bolt with a wooden handle at one end and an M (malefactor) at the other; close by are two iron loops for firmly securing the hands during the operation. The brander would, after examination, turn to the judge exclaiming "A fair mark, my lord." Criminals were formerly ordered to hold up their hands before sentence to show if they had been previously convicted.

In the 18th century, cold branding or branding with cold irons became the mode of nominally inflicting the punishment on prisoners of higher rank. "When Charles Moritz, a young German, visited England in 1782 he was much surprised at this custom, and in his diary mentioned the case of a clergyman who had fought a duel and killed his man in Hyde Park. Found guilty of manslaughter he was burnt in the hand, if that could be called burning which was done with a cold iron" (Markham's Ancient Punishments of Northants, 1886).

Such cases led to branding becoming obsolete, and it was abolished in 1829 except in the case of deserters from the army, who were marked with the letter D, not with hot irons but by tattooing with ink or gunpowder. Notoriously bad soldiers were also branded with BC (bad character). In 1879 this was abolished.

Branding in Australia
Offenders in Australia were subject to branding in accordance with British law. In 1826, in Hobart, Joseph Clarke was charged with manslaughter and ‘sentenced to be burnt in the hand’. In 1850, in New South Wales, deserter Daniel O’Neil was tattooed with the letter ‘D’.

Branding in Russia
Branding in Russia was used quite extensively in the 18th century and the first half of the 19th century. Over time, red hot iron brands were gradually replaced by tattoo boards; criminals were first branded on the forehead and cheeks, later on the back and arms. Branding was totally abolished in 1863.

Branding prostitutes
Forced and enslaved prostitutes have often been tattooed or branded with a mark of their owners. Women and girls being forced into prostitution would have their boss's name or gang symbol inked or branded with hot iron on their skin. In some organizations involved with the trafficking of women and girls like the mafias nearly all prostitutes are marked. Some pimps and organisations use their name or well-known symbol, others are using secret signs.

The branding is both painful and humiliating for the victim, especially when done with a branding iron, and may be also a form of punishment and of psychological submission for the prostitutes.

Some years ago the brands were usually small, only recognized by other pimps, sometimes hidden between the inner vaginal lips, though other instances show that pimps have no issue with larger, more noticeable brands.

Persisting practices

 Generally voluntary, though often under severe social pressure, branding may be used as a painful form of initiation, serving both as endurance and motivation test (rite of passage) and a permanent membership mark, seen as male bonding. Branding is also practiced as a form of body art, and sometimes in BDSM relationships. Branding is thus practiced:
 By some street gangs
 In organized crime as "stripes" to signify a violent crime that the person committed. Typically on the upper arm or upper torso.
 In prisons
 Sometimes as an extreme initiation in the increasingly less common tradition of painful hazing (otherwise mostly paddling).
 Some members of college fraternities and sororities voluntarily elect to be branded with their fraternity/sorority letters. This is far less common in sororities than fraternities and is especially prevalent in some historically African-American fraternities, such as Omega Psi Phi.
 As a voluntary body decoration – a form of permanent body art rather like many tattoos.
 In some consensual BDSM relationships, with a dominant branding their name or symbol onto their submissive.

Protests
In symbolic solidarity with Calf 269, protesters in Israel subjected themselves to branding on World Farm Animals Day (Gandhi's birthday): October 2, 2012. This act was emulated by others in England and the Czech Republic. An English protester who was interviewed justified the extremism as a reaction to the extreme cruelty perpetrated by the dairy industry such as shooting calves at birth.

Methods 

 Strike branding
 Similar to the process used to brand livestock,  a piece of metal is heated and pressed onto the skin for the brand. Historically it was used to claim ownership of slaves or to punish criminals, but as a form of body art, strike branding is less preferable to other types because it is not precise and tends to spread greatly on healing, and is not advisable for curved areas of the body. More successful is the multi-strike brand; it is done piece-by-piece rather than all at once. For example, to get a V-shaped brand, two lines would be burned separately by a straight piece of metal, rather than by a V-shaped piece of metal.
 Cautery branding
 This is a less common form of branding. It uses a thermal cautery tool with a heated wire tip to cause the burns.
 Laser branding
 "Laser" branding is a marketing term coined by Steve Haworth, who pioneered its use in body modification. The technical term is "electrosurgical branding". Though it is technically possible to use a medical laser for scarification, this term refers not an actual laser, but rather an electrosurgical unit which uses electricity to cut and cauterize the skin, similar to the way an arc welder works. Electric sparks jump from the hand-held pen of the device to the skin, vaporizing it. This is a more precise form of scarification, because it is possible to greatly regulate the depth and nature of the damage being done to the skin. Whereas with traditional direct branding, heat is transferred to the tissues surrounding the brand, burning and damaging them, electrosurgery branding vaporizes the skin so precisely and so quickly that little to no heat or damage to the surrounding skin is caused. This means that pain and healing time after the scarification is greatly lessened.
 Cold branding
 This rare method of branding is the same thing as strike branding, except that the metal branding tool is subjected to extreme cold (such as liquid nitrogen) rather than extreme heat.  This method will cause the hair on the brand to grow back white and will not cause keloiding. This process is also used in livestock and called freeze branding in that context.

See also
 Criminal tattoo
 Number of the beast
 Scarification for details on cosmetic branding

Sources

Brand & Cauterize on EtymologyOnLine
 W. Andrews, Old Time Punishments (Hull, 1890)
 A. M. Earle, Curious Punishments of Bygone Days (London, 1896).

References

External links 

Human Branding and Scarification Article
Branding at the BME Encyclopedia
The Hot Iron Database
Scarification Blog  at Scarwars.net

Body art
Corporal punishments
Torture
Mutilation
Scarification

fr:Marquage au fer